Stephen Gogolev (born December 22, 2004) is a Canadian figure skater. He is the 2019 Canadian national silver medallist.

Gogolev is the 2018 Junior Grand Prix Final champion, the 2018 JGP Slovakia champion, the 2019 JGP U.S. silver medallist, the 2020 Bavarian Open junior champion, and the 2017 Canadian junior national champion.

He has set five junior world record scores. He holds the Canadian record total score for junior men, as well as the national historical record total scores for pre-novice and novice men.

Personal life
Gogolev was born on December 22, 2004, in Toronto, Canada, to Irina Gogoleva and Igor Gogolev. He comes from an athletic family. His parents did gymnastics, and his mother was also a figure skater. He has an older brother, Peter Gogolev, a competitive kayaker. Gogolev holds dual Canadian and Russian citizenship. His hobbies are mountain biking, surfing, and tennis. He has a YouTube channel featuring his mountain biking videos. Gogolev is a university student at UC Irvine.

Career

Early years 
Gogolev began skating at the age of six in 2010. He began skating in Yekaterinburg, ultimately choosing it over skiing. In Russia, he learned the triple toe loop, triple Salchow, and double Axel. While competing in Russia, he was coached by Alexander Tarasov at DYUSSH No. 8 Lokomotiv. During this time he came to train annually in the summers at The Granite Club.

After moving to Canada, he began training at Thornhill FSC. He later joined Brian Orser and Lee Barkell at the Toronto Cricket, Skating and Curling Club in Toronto, Ontario.

2014–2015 season: National Pre-Novice champion
Competing at the pre-novice level, Gogolev won every competition he entered, including the Central Ontario sectional and Canadian national pre-novice titles as well as the gold medal at the 2015 Canada Winter Games, where he was the youngest competitor. He earned a historical record score while winning the pre-novice title at the 2015 Skate Canada Challenge. A video of Gogolev landing a triple Axel at age ten was shared by his club in January 2015, followed by a video of a landed quad Salchow in May 2015.

2015–2016 season: National Novice champion
Moving up to the novice level, Gogolev again had a golden season. He won the Central Ontario sectional, the 2016 Skate Canada Challenge, and the 2016 Canadian novice titles. He earned another historical record score at the 2016 Challenge. At Nationals, he landed a triple Axel in his free skate and won by over 20 points. After Nationals Coach Orser spoke about Gogolev landing a quad Salchow in practice, and that he had been working on a quad toe loop while being mentored by fellow skater Javier Fernández. In his international debut in March 2016, he won the advanced novice men title at the 2016 Coupe du Printemps.

2016–2017 season: National Junior champion
Competing at the junior level, Gogolev topped the podium in all events he competed in within Canada. He won the Central Ontario sectional, the 2017 Skate Canada Challenge, and the 2017 Canadian Championships junior titles. At Nationals, he came from behind to win the title over Conrad Orzel by a margin of four points. In February 2017, he won the advanced novice men title at 2017 Bavarian Open. He attempted a quad Salchow for the first time in international competition at this event, having included it in his free skate this season.

2017–2018 season
Gogolev competed exclusively at the senior level this season. He won the inaugural Skate Ontario senior men provincial title. At the 2018 Skate Canada Challenge, Gogolev ranked seventh in the short program and fourth in the free skate to come fourth overall. He came eleventh in the short program and ninth in the free skate at the 2018 Canadian Championships to end up tenth overall. Gogolev competed with a quad Salchow in his short and free programs this season and landed a quad toe for the first time in competition. Coach Orser confirmed that he is able to land all the quadruple jumps. He was a member of Skate Canada's NextGen Team this season.

2018–2019 season: Junior Grand Prix Final champion
Gogolev was once again chosen to be part of Skate Canada's NextGen Team. In May 2018, he worked with choreographers Marie-France Dubreuil and Samuel Chouinard on an exhibition program for the upcoming season. He was assigned to compete at JGP Bratislava and JGP Canada. At JGP Bratislava Gogolev skated a clean short program to take the lead with a score of 77.67. In the free skate, he landed a quad Lutz, quad toe, and quad Salchow triple toe combination to score 148.96 points. He was first in the free skate and won the gold medal with a score of 226.63. Gogolev became the first Canadian skater as well as the youngest skater to land the quad Lutz in competition.  In his second JGP event in Richmond, Gogolev was less successful, finishing in fifth place while struggling with his jumps.  He was named the first alternate to the Junior Grand Prix Final.

On November 4, 2018, Gogolev won another senior provincial title at the 2019 Skate Ontario Sectional Championships. Following the withdrawal of Andrew Torgashev from the Junior Grand Prix Final on November 12, Gogolev was added to the entry list as the sixth competitor. Gogolev placed second in the short program at the Final, behind Camden Pulkinen. In the free skate, he set a new junior world record score of 154.76 points, taking first place in the free skate to win the gold medal. His score of 233.58 points was also a new junior world record. He is the youngest winner of the men's competition at the Junior Grand Prix Final, breaking a record previously held by Yuzuru Hanyu.

At the 2019 Canadian Championships, Gogolev, skating as a senior, performed a clean short program to take the lead with a score of 88.77 points. In the free skate, he popped his quad Lutz but landed a clean quad toe loop as well as a quad Salchow in combination to earn a score of 164.79 points. He took the silver medal with a total score of 253.56 points.

On January 20, 2019, Skate Canada announced that Gogolev was selected to represent Canada at the 2019 World Junior Championships.  He skated cleanly in the short program at Junior Worlds, albeit with two jumping passes he described as "a little bit shaky", placing tenth in a closely packed field, only five points behind first-place finisher Pulkinen. In the free program, he doubled his planned quad Lutz and fell on a triple Axel but scored 143.66 points, winning a small bronze medal in the free skate and moving up to 5th overall with a score of 220.66 points. He ended his competition season with a performance at the exhibition gala.

On March 14, Gogolev was added as a guest star in the Toronto and Hamilton shows of the 2019 Stars on Ice Canada tour.

2019–2020 season: Injury and growth
In 2019 Gogolev began representing the Granite Club with coach Lee Barkell, while training in Irvine, California under coach Rafael Arutyunyan.

On July 2, 2019, it was announced that Gogolev became a member of Skate Canada's 2019-2020 National Team. He was also included in the list of skaters forming Skate Canada's 2019-2020 NextGen Team posted on July 15, 2019. Gogolev began his season with a win at the 2019 Glacier Falls Summer Classic. He was assigned to compete at 2019 JGP Lake Placid and 2019 JGP Croatia Cup.

Gogolev earned a new personal best short program score in Lake Placid. He came fifth in the free program after taking two falls. He won the silver medal with a score of 203.70 points.

At JGP Croatia Cup, Gogolev skated a clean short program with all level 3 elements to score 72.12 points and place sixth. In the free skate, he landed a quadruple Salchow and two triple Axels, one in combination, but singled two of his jumps. He scored 140.34 points to place fifth in the free skate and ranked fifth overall with a score of 212.46 points. Gogolev ended the Junior Grand Prix season with a final ranking of eighth and was named as the second alternate to the Junior Grand Prix Final.

Gogolev withdrew from the 40th Volvo Open Cup in October 2019. Subsequently, he withdrew from the 2020 Canadian Championships due to an injury, a bone bruise on his right ankle. He had also experienced a growth spurt. On January 19, 2020, he was selected to represent Canada at the 2020 World Junior Championships. He was also assigned to the 2020 Bavarian Open, where he won the junior men's event by 21 points.

At the 2020 World Junior Championships, Gogolev popped his planned triple Axel in the short program into a single, resulting in a score of 67.27 and a placement of 18th. In the free skate, he started off strong in the first half of his program but had some trouble with the jumps in the second half, missing two combinations. He later explained that the tongue of his boot broke as he went to do the planned triple Lutz, inhibiting him from properly performing his remaining jump elements. He placed 14th in the free skate with a score of 124.18 to move up to 17th overall with a final score of 191.45.

2020–2021 season

Gogolev was named to Skate Canada's 2020–2021 NextGen Team in May. On October 1, he was assigned to compete at 2020 Skate America, but he withdrew on October 7 due to injury. Gogolev did not compete this season as he faced issues related to a growth cycle.

2021–2022 season: Senior international debut

Gogolev was assigned to compete at the 2021 Warsaw Cup, his senior international debut. He placed fourteenth in the short program, eighth in the free program, and eleventh overall with a score of 206.17. In December, he won the 2022 Skate Canada Challenge senior men's title with a total score of 235.47, placing first in both the short and free programs. On January 6, 2022 he withdrew from the 2022 Canadian Championships after testing positive for COVID-19. 

Despite this, Gogolev was assigned to compete at the 2022 World Junior Championships on January 14. Scheduled to be held in Sofia, the championship was subsequently delayed from early March to mid-April and relocated to Tallinn due to Bulgarian pandemic measures. Gogolev skated a clean short program, scoring 78.75 points and placing sixth. In the free skate, he popped a quad Salchow to a double but landed another in combination, scoring 145.74 points and placing fifth. He ended up fifth overall with a score of 224.49.

2022–2023 season: Grand Prix debut

On July 22, 2022, it was announced that Gogolev had been assigned to two Grand Prix events, 2022 Skate Canada International and 2022 NHK Trophy. He was named to the Canadian national team on July 25. He began his season at the 2022 Glacier Falls Summer Classic, where he debuted a new short program he skated cleanly, scoring 88.68. He was assigned to the 2022 CS U.S. International Figure Skating Classic to start his international season, where he placed sixth. At his Grand Prix debut in Mississauga at 2022 Skate Canada International, Gogolev made errors in his short program and placed 11th. He rallied back with a strong free skate, where he placed fifth, moving up to seventh overall. At 2022 NHK Trophy, Gogolev popped his quad Salchow in the short program to end up ninth, scoring 69.01. He came back in the free skate earning a score of 152.01, placing seventh. He moved up to eighth with a season's best total score of 221.02.

At the 2023 Canadian Championships Gogolev struggled with his short program, scoring 49.97 and placing seventeenth. He stormed back in the free skate, scoring 170.16 and placing first in the segment, rising to fourth place overall. On January 15 he was assigned to compete at the 2023 Four Continents Championships. Gogolev invalidated a spin in the short program at the 2023 Four Continents Championships, scoring 72.82 and placing 11th. He was pleased with how he skated, but disappointed overall. In the free skate he popped both quad Salchows, scoring 136.94 and placing 11th. He ranked 13th overall with a score of 209.76.

Programs

Records and achievements 

At 13 years old, Gogolev was the youngest skater to land a quad Lutz at the 2018 Junior Grand Prix Slovakia, breaking the record previously held by then 15-year-old Daniel Grassl (ITA).
He was the youngest skater to land a quad Salchow at the 2018 Junior Grand Prix Slovakia, breaking the record previously held by then 13-year-old Alexandra Trusova (RUS).
The youngest skater to land a quad Toe loop at the 2018 Junior Grand Prix Slovakia, also a record previously held by Trusova.
The youngest skater to win the Junior Grand Prix Final for men, at the age of 13.
The first Canadian man to win the junior men's title at the Junior Grand Prix final

Junior world record scores 

Gogolev has set five junior world record scores under the new +5 / -5 GOE (Grade of Execution) system.

Competitive highlights 
GP: Grand Prix; CS: Challenger Series; JGP: Junior Grand Prix

Note: Before the 2017–2018 season, Gogolev competed in the Central Ontario section.

Detailed results 

Personal bests highlighted in italic.
ISU personal bests highlighted in bold.
World records highlighted in bold and italic. (Under the new scoring system, the International Skating Union restarted all records at zero on 1 July 2018. See: "Progression of record scores" under List of highest scores in figure skating.)

 Notes: The novice level within Canada differs from the advanced level offered by the ISU. Skate Canada Challenge is an important pre-Nationals qualifying competition.

References

External links
 
 Rink Results page
 Stats on Ice results page

! colspan="3" style="border-top: 5px solid #78FF78;" |World Junior Record Holders

2004 births
Canadian male single skaters
Canadian people of Russian descent
Living people
Figure skaters from Toronto